Bastien Girod (born 21 December 1980) is a Swiss politician, sustainability researcher, corporate and industry advisor.

Politician 
Since 2007, Bastien Girod (Green Party) has been an elected member of the Swiss national council, where he serves on the environment, spatial planning and energy committee.

Scientific career 
Girod is lecturer (Privatdozent) at the ETH Zurich on Sustainability and Technology. He also holds an Executive MBA from the University of Zurich, conducted a PhD at ETH Zurich with the title „Integration of Rebound Effects into Life-Cycle Assessment“.

Business activities 
Since 2018 Bastien Girod works at South Pole Group as corporate sustainability advisor and head of the DACH business development unit. In the same year he took over the presidency of the industry association for Swiss waste revalorization plants (VBSA), which is committed to a sustainable Swiss waste system.

External links 

Bastien Girod on the website of the ETH Zurich
Personal website (in German)

References 

1980 births
Green Party of Switzerland politicians
Living people
Members of the National Council (Switzerland)
Politicians from Zürich
Swiss businesspeople
21st-century Swiss politicians